The 1980 United States Senate election in New Hampshire was held on November 4, 1980. Incumbent Democratic U.S. Senator John Durkin was defeated by attorney Warren Rudman in a relatively close election, where nationwide Republicans would have a landslide election known as the Reagan Revolution.

Candidates

Democratic 
 John Durkin, incumbent U.S. Senator

Republican 
 Warren Rudman, former Attorney General of New Hampshire

Results

See also 
 1980 United States Senate elections

1980
New Hampshire
1980 New Hampshire elections